Corydoras noelkempffi is a tropical freshwater fish belonging to the Corydoradinae sub-family of the family Callichthyidae. It originates in inland waters in South America. Corydoras noelkempffi is found in Bolivia.

The fish is named in honor of conservation biologist Noel Kempff Mercado; for all his efforts to protect 750,000 hectares of biologically rich and geologically significant land in Bolivia which led to his murder by drug traffickers in 1986. In 1988, the land became Noel Kempff Mercado National Park.

References

Knaack, J., 2004. Beschreibung von sechs neuen Arten der Gattung Corydoras La Cépède, 1803 (Teleostei: Siluriformes: Callichthyidae). Zool. Abh., Staat. Mus. Tierk. Dresden 54:55-105. 

Corydoras
Catfish of South America
Fish of Bolivia
Taxa named by Joachim Knaack
Fish described in 2004